Finavon is a small settlement in Angus, Scotland. Its Ordnance Survey grid reference is NO4957.

References

Geography of Angus, Scotland